Ilex scabridula is a species of plant in the family Aquifoliaceae. It is endemic to New Guinea, occurring to over 3000 metres above sea level in disturbed and primary forest, often near rivers.

References

scabridula